The Pitt Islands are a group of small islands lying immediately off the north extremity of Renaud Island, at the north end of the Biscoe Islands. The name "Pitt's Island," after William Pitt the Younger, the British Prime Minister, was applied by John Biscoe in 1832 to an island which he erroneously charted as lying about 25 miles West North West of these islands. The present application of Pitt Islands is based on the interpretation of the British Graham Land expedition led by the Australian explorer John Rymill, who charted the island group in 1935–36.

Archipelagoes of the Southern Ocean
Islands of the Biscoe Islands